The 2018–19 season is Associazione Calcio ChievoVeronas eleventh consecutive season in Serie A. Chievo are competing in Serie A and the Coppa Italia, having finished 13th in the league the previous season.

Lorenzo D'Anna remained as coach of the club after replacing Rolando Maran during the 2017–18 season. On 13 September, Chievo were deducted 3 points after being found guilty of false accounting.

Players

Squad information

Appearances include league matches only

Transfers

In

Loans in

Out

Loans out

Competitions

Serie A

League table

Results summary

Results by round

Matches

Coppa Italia

Statistics

Appearances and goals

|-
! colspan=14 style="background:#FFFF00; color:blue; border:2px solid blue; text-align:center"| Goalkeepers

|-
! colspan=14 style="background:#FFFF00; color:blue; border:2px solid blue; text-align:center"| Defenders

|-
! colspan=14 style="background:#FFFF00; color:blue; border:2px solid blue; text-align:center"| Midfielders

|-
! colspan=14 style="background:#FFFF00; color:blue; border:2px solid blue; text-align:center"| Forwards

|-
! colspan=14 style="background:#FFFF00; color:blue; border:2px solid blue; text-align:center"| Players transferred out during the season

Goalscorers

Last updated: 25 May 2019

Clean sheets

Last updated: 25 May 2019

Disciplinary record

Last updated: 25 May 2019

References

A.C. ChievoVerona seasons
Chievo